Voivodeship road 678 in Poland is a voivodeship road with a length of 52 km located entirely in the Podlaskie Voivodeship.

Route
It is a route connects the Voivodeship administrative center Białystok with Wysokie Mazowieckie. It runs through the Wysokie Mazowieckie County (gminas: Wysokie Mazowieckie, Wysokie Mazowieckie commune, Sokoły commune) and Białystok poviat (communes: Łapy commune, Turośń Kościelna commune, Juchnowiec Kościelny commune, Białystok County, Białystok city).

There are 2 rail crossings on the route (in Kruszewo-Brodów and in Baciuty), several bridges over the rivers Ślina, Narew and Awissa. The route has 5 intersections with provincial and national roads. 

It is planned to change the course of the route to run through Łapy and from there along with DW681 to Białystok, in order to bring out heavy traffic from the Narew National Park, Łupianki Stara and Tołcz and improve transport from Wysokie Maz. To Łap and Bialystok. The construction of the Łap beltway and the dual carriageway route of Łapy - Bialystok is underway, and the belfry of Księżyna and a two-section section through Horodniany and Kleosin to the capital of the province was established.

References

678